This is the discography of Black the Ripper, a British rapper.

Studio albums
2018: Money Grows on Trees

Extended plays
2015: Excuse Me While I Kiss the Sky
2017: In Dank We Trust
2017: Doe or Die: Volume 1
2019: Doe or Die: Volume 2

Mixtapes
2005: Black Is Beautiful
2006: Holla Black
2007: Summer Madness
2008: Afro Samurai
2009: Outlaw: Volume 1
2010: Flooding the Industry
2012: Black Is Beautiful: Volume 2
2014: Outlaw: Volume 2

Weed Related Projects
2013: Married to Marijuana
2013: 420 Mixtape
2016: Motivated Stoner (2 Versions)

With Iron Barz
2014: High End Weed Music
2014: High End 2

With Cookie and Chipmunk
2007: Motivation Music: Volume 1
2007: Motivation Music: Volume 2
2008: Motivation Music: Volume 3

With Jeeday Jawz and Random Impulse
2009: The One Project

Compilations
2007: Unreleased S**t
2009: Unreleased S**t: Volume 2
2009: The Edmonton Dream
2012: Unreleased S**t: Volume 3

Singles

As primary artist

Guest appearances

Tributes

References

Hip hop discographies